Stanislas Moussa-Kembe is a diplomat from the Central African Republic. He has served as the ambassador to the United States since August 2009, taking over for Emmanuel Touaboy.

References

Living people
Ambassadors of the Central African Republic to the United States
Year of birth missing (living people)